Arcola Township is one of nine townships in Douglas County, Illinois, USA.  As of the 2010 census, its population was 3,312 and it contained 1,285 housing units.

Geography

Cities, towns, villages
 Arcola

Unincorporated towns
 Filson at 
 Galton at

Cemeteries
The township contains Township Cemetery.

Major highways
  Interstate 57
  U.S. Route 45
  Illinois Route 133

Demographics

School districts
 Arcola Consolidated Unit School District 306
 Tuscola Community Unit School District 301

Political districts
 State House District 110
 State Senate District 55

References
 
 United States Census Bureau 2009 TIGER/Line Shapefiles
 United States National Atlas

External links
 City-Data.com
 Illinois State Archives
 Township Officials of Illinois

Townships in Douglas County, Illinois
Townships in Illinois